Eker is a surname. Notable people with the name include:

Bård Eker (born 1961), Norwegian industrial designer and entrepreneur
Gunvor Katharina Eker (1906–1980), Norwegian politician
İlhan Eker (born 1983), Turkish football defender
Mehmet Mehdi Eker, Turkish politician
Selçuk Eker (born 1991), Turkish amateur boxer
T. Harv Eker (born 1954), Canadian author, businessman and motivational speaker

See also
Ecker (surname)